Juan Bautista Adarraga Elizarán (24 June 1924 – 21 September 1996) was a Spanish middle-distance runner. He competed in the men's 800 metres at the 1948 Summer Olympics.

References

External links
 

1924 births
1996 deaths
Athletes (track and field) at the 1948 Summer Olympics
Spanish male middle-distance runners
Olympic athletes of Spain
20th-century Spanish people